The Blatchley House is a historic house located at 370 Blatchley Road near Jordanville, Herkimer County, New York.

Description and history 
It was built in 1855, and is a two-story, nearly square timber-framed, flat-roofed vernacular Italianate style residence. It has a two-story main block above a high raised basement of cut and dressed limestone, with a two-story flat roofed wing.

It was listed on the National Register of Historic Places on August 15, 2008.

References

Houses on the National Register of Historic Places in New York (state)
Italianate architecture in New York (state)
Houses completed in 1855
Houses in Herkimer County, New York
National Register of Historic Places in Herkimer County, New York